Jordan Cohen (ג'ורדן כהן; born July 31, 1997) is an American-Israeli basketball player for Maccabi Haifa in the Israel Basketball Premier League, who plays the point guard position.

Early life
Cohen was born in Tarzana, California, and is Jewish.  He is 6" 2" tall, and weighs 185 pounds. He attended Campbell Hall High School ('16) in Studio City, California.

Maccabiah Games and college
Cohen  played basketball on Team USA in the 2017 Maccabiah Games, as the youngest player on the team. He averaged 6.2 points per game, as the team won the gold medal. He played on the team with among others Sam Singer and Travis Warech.

He attended and played basketball for Lehigh University, where Cohen majored in Finance ('20). Playing for the Lehigh Mountain Hawks he averaged 9.3 points per game as a sophomore. He was team captain his junior and senior years. His senior season he averaging 14.2 points per game, and ranked sixth in the Patriot League in three-point percentage (38.1 percent). His junior year and senior years he was named Third-Team All-Patriot League.  He was named to the Academic All-Patriot League team for his last three years.

Professional career
In August 2020 Cohen signed a one-year contract with Maccabi Haifa, in the Israel Basketball Premier League.

References 

Living people
American expatriate basketball people in Israel
Basketball players from California
Lehigh Mountain Hawks men's basketball players
Israeli men's basketball players
Jewish men's basketball players
Maccabiah Games medalists in basketball
1997 births
American men's basketball players
Maccabi Haifa B.C. players
People from Tarzana, Los Angeles
Competitors at the 2017 Maccabiah Games
Maccabiah Games gold medalists for the United States
Jewish American sportspeople
Jewish Israeli sportspeople
Israeli people of American-Jewish descent
21st-century American Jews